South Tweedsmuir Island is one of the Canadian arctic islands located in Foxe Basin, off the southwest coast of Baffin Island, in the Qikiqtaaluk Region of Nunavut, Canada. Foley Island is to the north, North Tweedsmuir Island is to the northwest, Prince Charles Island is to the west, and Air Force Island is to the south.

South Tweedsmuir Island is uninhabited and its temperatures are extremely cold. It measures  in area.

The island is named after John Buchan, 1st Baron Tweedsmuir who served as Governor General of Canada.

References

 Sea islands: Atlas of Canada; Natural Resources Canada

Islands of Foxe Basin
Uninhabited islands of Qikiqtaaluk Region